This is a list of episodes for the traditionally animated children's television series Rupert, which was originally broadcast on YTV.

Series overview

Episodes

Season 1 (1991)

Season 2 (1992)
Note: This is the last season made with Cel animation.

Season 3 (1994)
Note: This is the first season with digital animation.

Season 4 (1995)

Season 5 (1997)

External links
 

Rupert
Rupert
Rupert
Rupert
Rupert Bear